A108 may refer to:

Alpine A108, a car
Australia 108, a skyscraper in Melbourne, Australia
Dodge A100, aka Dodge 108, a van
A108 road, the former number of two roads in the Great Britain numbering scheme 
Batu Gajah Bypass, in Perak, Malaysia
 A-108 federal ring road in Russian Federation